Silver Valley may refer to:

 Silver Valley High School, California, USA
 Silver Valley Unified School District, California, USA
 Silver Valley, Idaho, USA,  the  Coeur d'Alene Mining District
 Silver Valley, North Carolina, USA
 Silver Valley, Alberta, Canada
 Silver Valley, Queensland, Australia
 Silver Valley (film), a 1927 American Western film